Mashulaville is an unincorporated community in Noxubee County, Mississippi, in the United States.

History
Mashulaville was named for Mushulatubbee, chief of the Choctaw.

Notable person
William Jernagin, an African-American civil rights activist, was born at Mashulaville in 1869.

References

Unincorporated communities in Noxubee County, Mississippi
Unincorporated communities in Mississippi
Mississippi placenames of Native American origin